Latambarcem is a village located in the North Goa district in the state of Goa, India. In 2001, the population was 6296. 3217 were male. 3079 were female.

References

Cities and towns in North Goa district